Metabolus is a monotypic genus of bird in the family Monarchidae found in Australia and Melanesia.

Taxonomy and systematics

Extant species
The genus Metabolus presently contains only a single species:
 Chuuk monarch (Metabolus rugensis)

Former species
Formerly, some authorities also considered the following species (or subspecies) as species within the genus Metabolus:
Yap monarch (as Metabolus godeffroyi)
Tinian monarch (as Metabolus takatsukasae)

References

 
Monotypic bird genera
Taxa named by Charles Lucien Bonaparte
Taxonomy articles created by Polbot